The 1995–96 Regionalliga was the second season of the Regionalliga as the third tier of German football. The league was organised in four regional divisions, Nord, Nordost, West-Südwest and Süd.

VfB Oldenburg, FC Gütersloh, Rot-Weiß Essen and Stuttgarter Kickers were promoted to the 2. Bundesliga while the three last placed in each division, except West/South-West, where it was the bottom four, were relegated to the Oberligas.

Regionalliga Nord

Final table

Top scorers

Regionalliga Nordost

Final table

Top scorers

Regionalliga West/Südwest

Final table

Top scorers

Süd

Final table

Top scorers

Promotion playoff 
The last promotion place was contested between the champions of the North and North-East regions. VfB Oldenburg won on aggregate, and so were promoted to the 2. Bundesliga.

References

External links
 Regionalliga Nord 1995–96  at kicker.de
 Regionalliga Nordost 1995–96  at kicker.de
 Regionalliga West/Südwest 1995–96  at kicker.de
 Regionalliga Süd 1995–96  at kicker.de

1995-96
3
Germ